SS Zachary Taylor (MC contract 244) was a Liberty ship built in the United States during World War II. She was named after Zachary Taylor, the twelfth President of the United States.

The ship was laid down by Permanente Metals in their Richmond Yard #2 on 6 October 1941, then launched on 28 February 1942. After the war she went on to suffer the same fate as most of the other surviving Liberty ships: she was scrapped in 1961.

After the end of World War II, Zachary Taylor was used to bring displaced European immigrants (mostly Jews) to New York City..  She docked at Brooklyn, New York at the Brooklyn Army Terminal on 19 September 1949.

See also

Convoy UGS-40

References 

Liberty ships
Ships built in Richmond, California
1942 ships